Baba Appo Aap Guru Nanak Public School is a higher-secondary co-education Independent school in the Patiala city of Punjab, India. The school was founded in 2012 and is affiliated to the Central Board of Secondary Education since 2013.

References 

Co-educational schools in India
High schools and secondary schools in Patiala
Educational institutions established in 2012
2012 establishments in Punjab, India